Steffi Graf was the defending champion but did not compete that year.

Kimiko Date won in the final 6–1, 6–2 against Lindsay Davenport.

Seeds
A champion seed is indicated in bold text while text in italics indicates the round in which that seed was eliminated. The top four seeds received a bye to the second round.

  Conchita Martínez (quarterfinals)
  Mary Pierce (quarterfinals)
  Lindsay Davenport (final)
  Natasha Zvereva (second round)
  Kimiko Date (champion)
  Anke Huber (quarterfinals)
  Magdalena Maleeva (semifinals)
  Iva Majoli (semifinals)

Draw

Final

Section 1

Section 2

External links
 1995 Toray Pan Pacific Open Draw

Pan Pacific Open
Toray Pan Pacific Open - Singles
1995 Toray Pan Pacific Open